R- may represent:
a type of chirality, in chemical notation
an R prefix used for various constants
the set of negative real numbers
negative reinforcement, in behavioural psychology
membership of the United States Republican Party, when placed before a state abbreviation, usually in parenthesis after the name of a politician